The angel, or demon Abaddon has appeared many times in works of literature, films, television and popular culture. In Hebrew the term Abaddon (Hebrew: אֲבַדּוֹן Avaddon), means "doom"; the Greek equivalent is Apollyon. In the Christian Bible it is both a place of destruction and an angel of the abyss. In the Hebrew Bible (Tanakh), abaddon is a bottomless pit, and often appears alongside the place שְׁאוֹל (Sheol), meaning the realm of the dead.

Literature
 In John Bunyan's allegory The Pilgrim's Progress, Abaddon (as Apollyon) appears as the "foul fiend" who assaulted Christian on his pilgrimage through the Valley of Humiliation. He rules over the city of Destruction, and attacks Christian when he refuses to return.
Louisa May Alcott subsequently references The Pilgrim's Progress in her novel Little Women, wherein Apollyon is used as a metaphor to represent main character Jo March's temper, a trait she seeks to overcome.
 In The Making of the English Working Class, E.P. Thompson entitled the second chapter of Part I, "Christian and Apollyon." 
 John Milton uses Abaddon as the name of the bottomless pit in Paradise Regained (IV, 264).
 In Friedrich Gottlieb Klopstock's epic poem  (The Messiah, composed 1748–73), Abbadona is an angel drawn into Satan's rebellion half-unwillingly, who reproves Satan for his blasphemous pride.
 Abaddon is mentioned by his Greek name, Apollyon, in Robert Browning's "Childe Roland to the Dark Tower Came".
 Abaddon appears as Abadonna, the angel of death in Mikhail Bulgakov's The Master and Margarita.
 Abaddón el Exterminador is the title of Argentine writer Ernesto Sabato's third and last novel, published in 1974. It was translated as The Angel of Darkness in English.
 The name of Azkaban, the main wizarding prison in the Harry Potter world, is a mixture of the name of Alkatraz, an island prison in the real world, and Abaddon.
 The fallen angel/demon Apollyon is the main antagonist of the Brazilian novel "A Batalha do Apocalipse" by Eduardo Spohr.

Popular culture
In Dan Brown's 2009 novel The Lost Symbol, the main antagonist, Zachary Solomon, believing himself to be the incarnation of the angel Malak, calls himself Dr Christopher Abaddon.
 Abaddon, the Angel of the Abyss, is a nickname for Marc Remillard in Julian May's Saga of Pliocene Exile and Galactic Milieu Series.
 Abaddon appears in Melissa de la Cruz's book series Blue Bloods as a blue blood named Benjamin 'Jack' Force.
 Abaddon is a creature/character in Patrick Carman's The Land of Elyon series.
 The third novel of Elizabeth Donald's Nocturnal Urges vampire series is titled Abaddon. In the horror novel, the vampire cult living underground in Memphis, Tennessee has adopted the name both for their group and the underground fortress in which they live.
 In City of Bones (part of The Mortal Instruments trilogy) by Cassandra Clare, Abaddon is a higher Demon who is summoned by a warlock for Valentine Morgenstern to employ in his war against the Clave.
 Apollyon is the title of the fifth book in the Left Behind series by authors Tim LaHaye and Jerry B. Jenkins and focuses on the attack of the demon locusts described in the Revelation of St. John.
 In Terry Brooks's Magic Kingdom of Landover, Abaddon is a netherworld that lies beneath Landover.
 In Wayne Barlowe's God's Demon, "Abaddon's Pit" is a deep pit in Hell where the demon Abaddon resides and is considered an eternal punishment of darkness and torment for demons who disobey the ruler of Hell, Beelzebub.
 The antagonists call upon a stealth bomber code-named Abaddon in Andy McDermott's book The Covenant of Genesis.
 In Scott Pinsker's novel The Second Coming: A Love Story, Abaddon is the leader of the rebellion against God, and Lucifer is actually the last to join the uprising. Abbadon later appears as a giant, scarred fish swimming in Hell's waters.
In book five of James Patterson's Daniel X series, Abbadon is portrayed as the second most wanted alien on Earth, who is the same species as the protagonist.
The 2019 film Godzilla: King of the Monsters mentions a Titan dubbed Abaddon, though it is not seen in the film. But the titan was discovered while at hibernation in Outpost 77 Devils Tower, Wyoming. A containment field was built around it for further studies of the creature before it arises and escapes after being awoken by King Ghidorah along side the other 17 titans.
Abaddon's Gate is the title of the third novel of The Expanse series, a space opera by James S. A. Corey.
Volume 10 of the High School DxD light novels by Ichiei Ishibumi has a character named Kuisha Abaddon who serves as the Queen of Sairaorg Bael. She uses a technique described as 'Hole', which creates a void in space that can suck in anything.
Blameless in Abaddon (1996) is the second book of James Morrow's "Godhead" trilogy.
Apollyon is an esoteric object class in the SCP Foundation universe and mythos that denotes an SCP that will or is causing the end of the world or a "XK-class scenario." The SCP-001 proposal "The Children" references a Group of Interest known as "Kingdom of Abaddon," a kingdom of highly powerful and hostile reality benders in the Sahara desert who were destroyed by the Foundation when they used the object.
Dawn Powell's 1948 novel The Locusts Have No King is a social satire centered around New York's literary elite and their desperate, debauched hangers-on. The title alludes to the biblical Locust King, Abaddon.
A demonic character named Abaddon appears in Brent Weeks's Lightbringer Series, first appearing in book three, The Broken Eye, then recurring in the fifth and final book, The Burning White.
Abaddon is the name of one of the rooms in the House of Drumer, many of which are named after demons, in Steve Jackson's 1984 Fighting Fantasy gamebook House of Hell.

Comics
 In issue 117 of Whiz Comics, Abaddon is revealed to have written a book of magic which a student uses to summon him. He is defeated by Ibis the Invincible and Taia, and falls to Hades by his own spell with the student and book.
 In David Hopkins' webcomic Jack, some demons of Hell use the unique suicide of a boy, Virgil, as a distraction in order to smuggle Abaddon (as a powerful relic) from Heaven into Hell to raise an army against God.
 In issue 32.5 (Feb 2012) of The Unwritten by Mike Carey and Peter Gross, Abaddon is a snake-like monster that feeds on stories, eventually confronted by Gilgamesh and thus inspiring the writing of the Epic of Gilgamesh. The comic also links Abaddon with Thomas Hobbes' Leviathan.
 The Abaddon is a serialized webcomic by Koren Shadmi, loosely based on Jean-Paul Sartre's No Exit.
In the oneshot Zone, by Hoshino Katsura, a Dagger named Abadon appears, perhaps there is a connection, as the dagger is a powerful Destroyer of demons called akuma, which appear in the oneshot and its successor D.Gray-Man.
Abaddon makes an appearance in the manga Samon-kun wa Summoner, being described as "The king of the pits of hell, the one who watches over the key of the pit that filled the king of demons captive for thousands of years".
The Monad - the distillation of human evil from the end of time - disguises itself as Abaddon, an alien bounty hunter, which hunted the ABC Warriors.

Occult literature
 In occultism and esoterism, Abaddon's Tarot symbol is Judgement.
 In Barrett's The Magus, Abaddon is pictured as one of the evil demons.
 In LaVeyan Satanism, Abaddon is the first of the infernal names, as it comes first alphabetically, meaning "The Destroyer".
 In the Key of Solomon, Abaddon is listed as the name of God used by Moses to flood Egypt.
 In Sepharial's Manual of Occultism, Abaddon is in charge of the Furies, the seventh order of nine orders of demons.

Music
 Abaddon (as Apollyon) appears in Act 2 of the opera The Pilgrim's Progress by Ralph Vaughan Williams. 
 Trilogy, the third studio album of the progressive rock band Emerson, Lake & Palmer, ends with an eight-minute instrumental titled "Abaddon's Bolero".
 Former drummer Anthony Bray of the English heavy metal band Venom used Abaddon as his stage name
 There is an Irish death metal/black metal/grindcore band called "Abaddon Incarnate".
 Indie rock band Pinback's 2004 album is titled Summer in Abaddon.
 American deathcore band With Blood Comes Cleansing's album Horror has a track called "Abaddon's Horde".
 American metal band Saviours titled their 2008 album Into Abaddon which features a track of the same name.
 The album Sunrise Over a Sea of Blood by American metal band Mortal Treason features a song titled "Abaddon".
 Polish heavy/thrash metal band KAT mentions Abaddon in their song "The Time of Revenge".
 Spanish Power metal band Phoenix Rising have a track titled "Abaddon" on their album MMXII.
 Abaddon is the name of a Polish hardcore punk band.
 Czech black-metal band Root have a track titled "Abaddon" on their second studio album, Hell Symphony.
 The rapper Boondox released a song on Halloween 2011 entitled "Abadon", the inspiration of which derives from Abaddon.
 "Lords of Abaddon" is the first track on the 2011 album The Taking (album) by American rock band Loaded.
 American heavy metal band Manowar mentions Abaddon in their song "Dark Avenger" in the portion of the track narrated by Orson Welles.
 The rapper Boondox released an album on 13 May 2014 entitled Abaddon.
 The band Blind Guardian references Abaddon in their song "The Ninth Wave" from their album Beyond the Red Mirror.
Welsh dark ambient composer Brian Lustmord has a track titled Abaddon on his album The Word As Power
The Artist Methadone Matt has a song on YouTube called Abaddon

Film
Abadddon appears as the primary antagonist in the horror film The Heretics.
Abaddon (as Apollyon) also appears as one of the demons who possessed Clarita in the latest 2019 Philippine horror film, Clarita, inspired by the story of Clarita Villanueva.
one of the 17 titans is named after Abaddon appears on a monitor in Godzilla: King of the Monsters in the film it is awoken by King Ghidorah along side the other titans.
The town of Abaddon and the Abaddon Hotel are named after Abaddon in Hell House LLC and its sequel
 Abaddon appears in the tattooed finger of BJ, the main villain of the movie Contracted: Phase II. It appears also in the mid-credits scene in the finger of the doctor assisting BJ while telling him, "Very soon, my friend, very soon".

Television
 In the Mr. Belvedere episode "Halloween" (season 3, episode 5, 1986), The Happy Guys of Pittsburgh organization offers membership to George, which features an oath and induction ceremony specifically noting Abaddon.
 In the Star Trek: Voyager episode "Alice" (season 6, episode 5, 1999), Abaddon is the proprietor of "Abaddon's Repository of Lost Treasures". He sells Voyager a small spaceship that is "haunted": it takes over the minds of its owners through its unique neural interface.
 In the season three premiere episode ("Aquamom", 2006) of Entourage, James Woods claims to have played the character Abaddon in the fictional movie Aquaman starring Vincent Chase.
 In the BBC series Torchwood, Abaddon appears in the episode "End of Days" (2007) as the son of the Beast, an alien being from "the void".
 Matthew Abaddon is a mysterious character in the television series Lost who works for Charles Widmore, appearing in seasons 4 (2008) and 5 (2009).
 Vesper Abaddon is the former King of Carmel, a nation preceding Gilboa, the setting of the NBC TV show Kings (2009). The prison he is kept in is called Gehenna.
 In The CW series The Secret Circle (2011-2012), the witches get possessed by a demon named Abaddon.
 In the HBO series Enlightened (2011-2013), Abaddon is the name of the "unenlightened" company where the main protagonist, Amy Jellicoe, works.
 In a season 8 episode of the TV show Supernatural, "As Time Goes By", the Winchester brothers' grandfather travels forward in time to receive aid against a demon named Abaddon. In this continuity, Abaddon is a Knight of Hell; one of the first demons to fall with Lucifer and as such is very powerful. She later returns for "Clip Show" and "Sacrifice." She reappears in season 9 (2013-2014) as one of the main antagonists before being killed by Dean Winchester in "King of the Damned."
 Prior to Abaddon appearing in the show, the character featured in the spin-off novel Supernatural: War of the Sons by Rebecca Dessertine and David Reed, where Abaddon was presented as a fallen angel who called himself Don, set during the show's fifth season, attempting to convince the Winchesters to accept their destined role in the Apocalypse by sending them into the past to find the 'War Scroll', a scroll that allegedly contained the key to stopping the Apocalypse but only listed the bloodlines of families who can act as the vessel for angels.
 In "Impossible Planet", Episode 8 of Season 2 of the BBC series Doctor Who (aired June 3, 2006), the beast in the pit tells the Doctor and the crew of the space station that "some have called me Abaddon."

Games
 A character called Abaddon, the Lord of Avernus, appears in both Defense of the Ancients and its sequel, Dota 2.
 A character called Apollyon appears in the game The Binding of Isaac as one of the various personalities of the character Isaac
 In Diablo II: Lord of Destruction, there is a portal in the Frigid Highlands that leads to an area in Hell labeled as Abaddon.
 In Otomedius G and Salamander 2, there are boss opponents named Abbadon.
 In the game Dungeon Runners, Abaddon appears as a boss creature.
 Abaddon is the name of a two-handed sword that drops from Yogg-Saron in Blizzard's popular MMORPG World of Warcraft.
 Abaddon is the name of a class of Amarr Battleship in the space MMORPG EVE Online.
 In The Binding of Isaac: Rebirth, Abaddon is the name of an item that can be obtained by making a deal with the Devil.
 In the Afterbirth+ expansion for the same game, Apollyon, an alternate name for Abaddon is a playable character.
 In the DOOM source port Skulltag, an Abaddon is the strongest variant of the Cacodemon.
 Abaddon appears as a Spider Boss in the online MMORPG Adventurequestworlds.
 Abaddon appears in Games Workshop's Warhammer 40,000 fictional universe as Abaddon the Despoiler. He was the 2nd in command of Horus, who was corrupted by Chaos, and thus rebelled against the Imperium of Man in a bloody civil war, and since the death of Horus, has assumed command of the forces of all forces that broke from Earth.
 Abaddon appears in the Battletech Universe as Precentor Apollyon, the commander of the Word of Blakes elite Manei-Domini.
 Abaddon is a boss enemy in Konami's Castlevania: Curse of Darkness, Dawn of Sorrow and Portrait of Ruin.
 The Beast of Abaddon is a boss creature in the Flagship Studios game Hellgate: London.
 Abaddon is a boss enemy in the Square video game Final Fantasy VIII in the salt flats outside the xenophobic city-state Esthar. They also makes a few other appearances in the franchise such as in Final Fantasy IX where they are wandering enemies in Castle Pandemonium and Final Fantasy: Crystal Chronicles where Abbadons appear in Conall Curach.
 Abaddon, the God of Secrets and the preceding God of Water, is the main antagonist of the Guild Wars campaign, "Nightfall".
 In the 2003 SCE Studio Cambridge action video game Primal, the main (albeit unseen) antagonist is the God of Chaos Abaddon.
 Abaddon is a recurring demon of the Megami Tensei franchise. His appearance can be either a giant green slime with a giant mouth, or a bald winged head emerging from the ground.
 In Shin Megami Tensei II, Abaddon is summoned by the Center to devour the district of Valhalla.
 In Shin Megami Tensei: Nocturne, Abaddon is a boss and can later be created in the Cathedral of Shadows.
 Abaddon is a playable high-level persona in Shin Megami Tensei Persona 3, 4 & 5
 In Shin Megami Tensei: Devil Survivor, Abaddon is a demon of the Vile race.
 In Shin Megami Tensei: Digital Devil Saga 2, Abaddon is a mid-boss created when a leader devours his partners to get more strength.
 Abaddon is central to the investigation in Devil Summoner 2: Raidou Kazunoha vs. King Abaddon. His minions are the Appolyons.
 Abaddon appears in the real-time strategy game Warrior Kings as a godlike unit.
 Abaddon appears as a major character in Darksiders, serving as the main antagonist in the first game.
 Abaddon is a playable character in the game Unreal Tournament 2004.
 Abaddon is a choice for player's avatar in Solium Infernum.
 Abaddon is a flagship for the human race in the Xbox Live game Abaddon Retribution.
 Abaddon is the name of a Martian in the game Super Motherload
 Abaddon is the name of a software studio that produces roleplaying and strategy games founded in Winona, Minnesota.
 Abaddon is a recruitable hero in the idle game Clicker Heroes, with an appearance similar to that of a Grim Reaper.
 Abaddon is the name of an international Ingress anomaly series starting in October 2015.
 Abaddon, listed as Apollyon, is a skill of Chiliarch and Dreadlord in the Korean MMORPG Elsword.
 Abaddon, listed as Apollyon, is a Warlord in the Story Mode of For Honor a fighting game by Ubisoft.
 In the game Fallout: New Vegas, the Cave of the Abaddon is part of the path the Courier must take in The Divide to reach Ulysses.
 Destiny: Rise of Iron'''s "The Dawning" event introduced a machine gun known as Abbadon, sporting fire sprawling across it and a hellish design.
 Abaddon is the name of several evil characters in the Redemption card game.
 Apolloyon is the name of a major NPC during the July monthly event on the online sim game, Lioden. He is the rival of Apedemak and the paramour of Menhit.
 Abaddon, referred to as Apollyon or simply "Polly", is a prominent character in the game Afterparty''. She is the former Grand Judge of the Dead.

References

External links
 

Demons in popular culture